Cream Ridge is an extinct town in Livingston County, in the U.S. state of Missouri. The GNIS classifies it as a populated place.

A post office called Cream Ridge was established in 1868, and remained in operation until 1893. The community most likely took its name from Cream Ridge Township.

References

Ghost towns in Missouri
Former populated places in Livingston County, Missouri